The Linden Street Bridge is a historic bridge on the abandoned Central Massachusetts Railroad over Linden Street (Massachusetts Route 60) in Waltham, Massachusetts. It is a riveted lattice through truss bridge, built in 1894 by the Pennsylvania Steel Company, and is one of only three such bridges left in the state. The design of the bridge was based on that of the Northampton crossing of the Connecticut River by the same railroad. This section of the Central Massachusetts Branch, and the bridge, have been out of service since the early 1990s when service to the last customer, a lumber dealer located on Emerson Road, ended.

The bridge was listed on the National Register of Historic Places in 1989. In 2022, the city was awarded a $500,000 state grant to restore the bridge as part of the Mass Central Rail Trail.

See also
List of bridges documented by the Historic American Engineering Record in Massachusetts
List of bridges on the National Register of Historic Places in Massachusetts
National Register of Historic Places listings in Waltham, Massachusetts

References

External links

Railroad bridges on the National Register of Historic Places in Massachusetts
Bridges completed in 1894
Bridges in Middlesex County, Massachusetts
Railroad bridges in Massachusetts
Buildings and structures in Waltham, Massachusetts
Historic American Engineering Record in Massachusetts
National Register of Historic Places in Waltham, Massachusetts
Steel bridges in the United States
Lattice truss bridges in the United States